Christian Köhler (13 October 1809, Werben - 30 January 1861, Montpellier) was a German painter, associated with the Düsseldorfer Malerschule, although his style owes much to the Nazarene movement.

Life and work 
While working as a groom for the writer, Heinrich Clauren, he became acquainted with the painter, Friedrich Wilhelm von Schadow. When Schadow moved from Berlin to Düsseldorf, he followed and became one of his private students. In 1827, he enrolled at the Kunstakademie Düsseldorf, where he progressed to the master classes by 1837. That same year, he participated in the exhibition at the  that established the "Düsseldorfer Schule".

From 1852, he was a Professor and assistant to Theodor Hildebrandt at the Kunstakademie; succeeding him as head of the Antikensaals (antiquities collection) in 1855, when Hildebrandt became too ill to work. During the school year of 1859/60, he became ill himself and went to Southern France, seeking a cure. He died there the following year.

He was a member of the progressive artists' association, Malkasten. Many of his works were reproduced as engravings or lithographs.

References

Further reading 
 
 "Köhler, Christian". In: Friedrich von Boetticher: Malerwerke des 19. Jahrhunderts. Beitrag zur Kunstgeschichte. Vols. 1/2, Heideck–Mayer, 1895, pp. 724–725 (Online)
 Hans Vollmer, "Köhler, Christian", In: Allgemeines Lexikon der Bildenden Künstler von der Antike bis zur Gegenwart, Ulrich Thieme and Felix Becker (Eds.), Vol.21, Knip–Krüger, E. A. Seemann, 1923 
 Wend von Kalnein: Die Düsseldorfer Malerschule. Verlag Philipp von Zabern, Mainz 1979, pg. 365 f.

External links 

1809 births
1861 deaths
19th-century German painters
19th-century German male artists
German male painters